USS Durik (DE-666) was a  of the United States Navy, in service from 1944 to 1946. After spending two decades in reserve, she was scrapped in 1967.

Namesake
Joseph Edward Durik was born 9 December 1922 in southwest Pennsylvania. He enlisted in the United States Naval Reserve on 5 January 1942. Apprentice Seaman Durik was killed in action 15 March 1942 following the accidental firing of a torpedo aboard destroyer . For his selfless conduct in giving first aid to an injured shipmate although wounded himself, he was posthumously commended by Admiral Chester W. Nimitz.

History
Durik was launched 9 October 1943 by Dravo Corp., Neville Island, Pennsylvania; sponsored by Mrs. M. Durik, mother of Seaman Apprentice Durik; and commissioned 24 March 1944.

Battle of the Atlantic
Between 20 May and 30 November 1944 Durik made two voyages from New York and Norfolk, Virginia escorting convoys to Casablanca, Bizerte, and Palermo. She served as schoolship for precommissioning crews of escort vessels, frigates, and high-speed transports at Norfolk from 9 December 1944 to 14 January 1945, then returned to convoy duty, making two voyages to Oran, Algeria, between 17 January 1945 and 19 May. John D. Cartano was the acting captain of Durik in 1944–1945.

Durik arrived at Miami, Florida, 8 June 1945 to serve as schoolship for the instruction of student officers. From 21 July to 5 September she was briefly overhauled at New York and trained at Guantanamo Bay, then returned to duty at Miami until 1 November when she arrived at Mayport, Fla., to serve as plane guard for  during the qualifications of pilots in carrier operations. On 28 March 1946 Durik entered Charleston Naval Shipyard, and on 27 April arrived at Green Cove Springs, Fla., where she was placed out of commission in reserve 15 June 1946.

Fate
Durik was struck from the Naval Vessel Register on 1 June 1965 and sold for scrap on 30 January 1967.

References

External links  

      navsource.org: USS Durik
   hazegray.org: USS Durik

Buckley-class destroyer escorts
Ships built in Pennsylvania
1943 ships